Paul Fry may refer to:

Paul Fry (professor), American professor of English at Yale University
Paul Fry (speedway rider) (1964–2010), British motorcycle speedway rider
Paul Fry (baseball) (born 1992), American baseball player